Dacri is a surname. Notable people with the surname include:

Giovanni Dacri (died 1485), Italian Roman Catholic bishop
Steve Dacri (1952–2011), American magician